Gora pri Pečah is a settlement in the Municipality of Moravče in central Slovenia. The area is part of the traditional region of Upper Carniola. It is now included with the rest of the municipality in the Central Slovenia Statistical Region.

Name
Gora pri Pečah was attested in historical sources as Perg in 1444. The name of the settlement was changed from Gora svetega Florjana (literally, 'Mount Saint Florian') to Gora pri Pečah (literally, 'mountain near Peče') in 1955. The name was changed on the basis of the 1948 Law on Names of Settlements and Designations of Squares, Streets, and Buildings as part of efforts by Slovenia's postwar communist government to remove religious elements from toponyms.

Church

The local church is dedicated to Saint Florian and belongs to the Parish of Vače. It dates to the early 16th century but was extensively rebuilt in the late 17th century.

References

External links

Gora pri Pečah on Geopedia

Populated places in the Municipality of Moravče